Fitchia cordata is a species of flowering plant in the family Asteraceae. It is found only in French Polynesia.

References

cordata
Flora of French Polynesia
Critically endangered flora of Oceania
Taxonomy articles created by Polbot